The 30th America's Cup was won by Team New Zealand, who swept the 2000 Louis Vuitton Cup winner Prada Challenge in all five races. It was the first America's Cup without an American challenger or defender.

Races

Crew

Team New Zealand

* Sailed in Race 5
The crew included Rick Dodson, Hamish Pepper, Jeremy Scantlebury, Murray Jones, Matthew Mason, Jeremy Lomas, Craig Monk, Chris Ward, Grant Loretz, Mike Drummond, Jono Macbeth, Barry McKay, Joe Allen, Nick Heron, Tony Rae, Dean Phipps, Warwick Fleury and Simon Daubney. Peter Blake did not sail with the team in 2000, acting as the on-shore manager.

Peter Evans was the backup tactician and ran the weather programme.

Prada Challenge

References

ultimatesail.com

 
2000
America's Cup, 2000
Americas Cup
Sport in Auckland
Sailing competitions in New Zealand
February 2000 sports events in New Zealand
March 2000 sports events in New Zealand
Auckland waterfront
Waitematā Harbour